Maacynips is a genus of gall wasp tentatively placed in the tribe Eucoilini. It was originally described in 1963 by Carl M. Yoshimoto. Subsequent research did not find more samples of the genus. It was placed under the tribe Eucoilini in 2008 by Forshage, Nordlander, and Ronquist. Maacynips is currently under review and its status is unclear.

Species 
Yoshimoto described three species under Maacynips, which are also under review.

 Maacynips distincta
 Maacynips papuana
 Maacynips parva

References 

Cynipoidea
Hymenoptera genera